Gabriella Michelle Henderson (born 12 January 1996), known as Ella Henderson, is an English singer and songwriter. She competed in the ninth series of The X Factor UK in 2012, finishing in sixth place despite being a strong favourite to win. She signed with Syco Music shortly after, and released her debut studio album, Chapter One (2014), which reached number one in the UK. The album spawned the chart-topping single "Ghost", as well as the top 20 singles "Glow" and "Yours".

Henderson went on a four-year hiatus in 2015. Her second studio album, Everything I Didn't Say, was released in March 2022. In addition to solo material, she recorded several successful collaborations, including "Glitterball" with Sigma, "Here for You" with Kygo (both in 2015), "This Is Real" with Jax Jones, "We Got Love" with Sigala (both in 2019), "Let's Go Home Together" with Tom Grennan (2021), "Crazy What Love Can Do" with David Guetta and Becky Hill, and "21 Reasons" with Nathan Dawe (both in 2022), five of which reached the top 10 in the UK.

Early life 
Gabriella Michelle Henderson was born in Tetney, Lincolnshire, on 12 January 1996, the daughter of Michelle and Sean Henderson. She has two brothers and a sister. 

She began singing when she was around three years old and taught herself to play the piano a few years later. She put on Christmas shows for her family at and was encouraged to pursue her love of music and songwriting by her paternal grandfather. Her interest developed further at St Martins Prep School in Grimsby, and she subsequently decided to audition for a scholarship place at Tring Park School for the Performing Arts in Tring. She boarded at the school between the ages of 11 and 16. She attended the school at the same time as Dan Ferrari-Lane, who later became a member of the boyband District3 which appeared on The X Factor alongside Henderson in 2012. In early 2012, she made a singing appearance on a celebrity Christmas special of the Channel 4 series Come Dine with Me, where she performed "All I Want for Christmas Is You".

Career

2012: The X Factor 

Henderson auditioned for series nine of The X Factor in 2012, with the original song called "Missed", which was later included on her debut studio album. She reached the live shows and was mentored by Tulisa. Henderson and James Arthur were controversially in the bottom two in week seven and sang for survival. Tulisa and Louis Walsh voted to send Henderson through to the quarter-final and Nicole Scherzinger and Gary Barlow voted to send Arthur through to the quarter-final. The result went to deadlock and Arthur advanced to the quarter-final receiving 13.7% of the vote and Henderson received 12.1%. She consequently finished in sixth place, despite being a strong favourite to win.

Presenter Dermot O'Leary described Henderson's exit as "one of the biggest shocks we've ever had on the results show". During the show and following her exit, a number of celebrities stated their support and praise for Henderson, including Adele, Lily Allen, Cher, Simon Cowell, Stephen Fry, Nick Grimshaw, Sarah Millican, and Chloë Grace Moretz. On a 2013 episode of The Xtra Factor, O'Leary said that he viewed Henderson as the most talented performer he had seen during his seven years on the show.

2012–2015: Chapter One 

In December 2012, Henderson made an appearance on Ireland's RTÉ The Saturday Night Show, singing "Silent Night". While being interviewed on the show, she revealed that she had signed a record deal with Sony Music Entertainment. She also performed "Last Christmas" and "Have Yourself a Merry Little Christmas" on the Myleene Klass Heart FM show that month. In January 2013, Henderson confirmed she had signed to Simon Cowell's record label Syco Music. During January and February 2013, she took part in The X Factor live tour, where she sang four songs: her X Factor audition song "Missed", "Believe", "Rule the World" and "You Got the Love". She also performed "Believe" at the 18th National Television Awards in January, and appeared as a special guest at the Capital Summertime Ball in June, where she performed a duet of "Beneath Your Beautiful" with Labrinth.

Henderson's debut single, "Ghost", co-written with Ryan Tedder, was released on 8 June 2014. It debuted at number one on the UK Singles Chart, and remained in the top five of the chart for eight consecutive weeks. It has subsequently been certified platinum for sales in Australia, New Zealand, the United Kingdom, and the United States. The song later ranked at number 84 on the Official Charts Company list of the 100 biggest songs of the 2010s in the UK. Its follow-up, "Glow", was released on 5 October 2014 and charted at number seven in the UK. Henderson's debut studio album, Chapter One, was released on 13 October 2014. It was written by Henderson in collaboration with a number of writers and producers including Claude Kelly, Salaam Remi, Babyface and TMS. The album peaked at number one on the UK Albums Chart, and was the 19th and 31st best-selling album in the UK in 2014 and 2015, respectively. It was certified platinum by the British Phonographic Industry (BPI). The album also charted in the top 20 in Australia, Austria, Denmark, Ireland, New Zealand, Norway, Switzerland, and the United States. Its third and fourth singles, "Yours" and "Mirror Man", were released on 30 November 2014 and 9 March 2015, respectively. The former charted at number 16 in the UK.

Henderson performed as the supporting act for Take That on their 38 date Take That Live 2015 UK tour, while embarking on her debut headlining UK tour in October and November 2015. That July, she featured on drum and bass duo Sigma's single "Glitterball", which peaked at number four in the UK. Henderson also featured on Norwegian record producer and DJ Kygo's song "Here for You", which was released on 4 September. The collaboration achieved global-wide chart success peaking within the top 20 in the Netherlands, Norway, Sweden, Switzerland and the United Kingdom.

2016–2019: Asylum Records and Glorious 

In November 2016, Henderson announced that she had finished recording her second studio album, having worked with Danny O'Donoghue from The Script and producer Max Martin. In April 2017, it was announced that she would be supporting James Arthur on his Back from the Edge Tour. In June, she featured along with other artists, including fellow X Factor artists Leona Lewis, Louis Tomlinson, Liam Payne, James Arthur, Louisa Johnson and Matt Terry on a cover version of Simon & Garfunkel's song "Bridge over Troubled Water", which was recorded to raise money for those affected by the Grenfell Tower fire in London earlier that month. The single reached number one in the UK after only two days sales. Later that year, it was announced that Arthur had recorded a duet with Henderson, reportedly set to be included on her second studio album. While supporting him on his tour, she performed new songs that were set to be included on the record: "Ugly", "Cry Like a Woman", "Bones", "Solid Gold" and "Let's Go Home Together", her duet with Arthur.

In February 2018, it was announced that Henderson and Syco Music had parted ways. In a statement, a Syco representative stated: "Syco and Ella Henderson are parting company. We wish Ella all the best for the future and thank her for her hugely successful contribution over the years." In May 2018, Henderson confirmed that she had completed work on her second studio album. Later that year, she signed a record deal with Asylum Records' imprint Major Toms operated by the British group Rudimental, and was working on new material with them, presumably meaning that the previously confirmed album was scrapped. She also supported Rudimental on their European tour that year. Regarding the scrapped material, Henderson later told i: "I did write an album – well, I say an album, I wrote a body of work. But I was so lost in terms of who I was as a person that I wasn't ready to release it. I knew that if I didn't know what was going on, my fans wouldn't either."

On 13 September 2019, Henderson released "Glorious" as the lead single from her EP of the same name, which was released on 8 November. Its second single, "Young", was released on 11 October. Henderson also featured on Jax Jones' song "This Is Real", from his debut album Snacks (Supersize), which was released as a single on 11 October, and on Sigala's single "We Got Love", which was released on 1 November. Both tracks charted in the UK, peaking at numbers 9 and 42, respectively.

2020–present: Everything I Didn't Say and collaborations 

Henderson featured on Dutch DJ Sam Feldt's song "Hold Me Close" released on 27 March 2020. She followed it with the single "Take Care of You" on 12 June, which reached number 50 in the UK. In July, she provided uncredited vocals for a UK top five single she had co-written titled "Lighter" by British DJ and producer Nathan Dawe, featuring British YouTuber and rapper KSI. Henderson released the single "Dream On Me" with Roger Sanchez on 2 October 2020, and a Christmas song "Blame It on the Mistletoe" with AJ Mitchell on 4 December.

On 19 February 2021, she released her collaboration with Tom Grennan titled "Let's Go Home Together", which debuted at number 28 in the UK and peaked at 10 becoming Henderson's fifth UK top 10 single. The song was originally a duet between Henderson and James Arthur, and they performed it together live on Arthur's 2017 arena tour, but due to a scheduling conflict Henderson recorded its single version with Grennan instead. On 20 August 2021, Henderson released the single "Risk It All" with House Gospel Choir and Just Kiddin, followed by a collaboration with the French DJ duo Ofenbach titled "Hurricane" the next month.

On 7 January 2022, she released the single "Brave", which preceded her second studio album, Everything I Didn't Say, released on 11 March 2022. "Brave" reached number 42 in the UK, while Everything I Didn't Say debuted at number eight. In April, she collaborated with David Guetta and Becky Hill on the song "Crazy What Love Can Do". The single charted in several countries, including the UK where it debuted in the top 20 and peaked at number five. In April 2022, Nathan Dawe released a second collaboration with Henderson titled "21 Reasons", which reached number nine in the UK. On 9 September 2022, Henderson collaborated with British-German DJ duo M-22 on the song "Heartstrings".

Later in 2022, Henderson performed at a number of UK Pride events, as well as UK Music and TikTok showcases held at the Labour Party Conference and Conservative Party Conference. Although the Labour conference performance was cancelled due to illness, Henderson's appearance at the Conservative conference attracted criticism from the LGBT Community, as some felt it was incompatible with performing at Pride Events. The UK Music Industry released a statement pointing out that the events were held as part of the political party conferences to highlight the importance of the UK music industry and were not an indication of political affiliation. Neither Henderson or her management team quoted the UK Music Industry statement or commented on the controversy.

Personal life 
Henderson has been in a relationship with English retired swimmer Jack Burnell since early 2020.
They became engaged in January 2023.

Discography 

 Chapter One (2014)
 Everything I Didn't Say (2022)

Tours

Headlining 
Chapter One Tour (2015)
Everything I Didn't Say Tour (2022)

Supporting 
Take That Live (2015; UK leg)
Back from the Edge Tour (2017)
Tales from the Script: Greatest Hits Tour (2022)

Awards and nominations

Notes

References

External links 

 
 

1996 births
21st-century English singers
21st-century English women singers
English child singers
English people of Scottish descent
English soul singers
English women pop singers
English women singer-songwriters
Living people
Musicians from Lincolnshire
People educated at Tring Park School for the Performing Arts
People from Tetney, Lincolnshire
Syco Music artists
The X Factor (British TV series) contestants